Benjamin Fall (born 3 March 1989) is a French rugby player who currently plays for Montpellier in the Top 14 club competition. He plays as a wing. He was part of the 2008 IRB Junior World Championship playing for France playing 4 games and scoring 2 tries. He then played for Union Bordeaux Bègles in the 2007–08 Rugby Pro D2 season, playing 12 games and scoring 3 tries before being moving to Bayonne. He was selected for the French national team for the 2009 Autumn Internationals after his performances in the Top 14.

Fall took part in the 2010 Six Nations Championship for France, starting on the wing against Scotland.

Benjamin Fall moved to the Parisian club Racing Métro for the 2010–11 season.; then he joined Montpellier for the 2014–15 season.

Honours
 2015–16 European Rugby Challenge Cup : winner.

References

External links
France profile at FFR
  Statistiques par itsrugby.fr

1989 births
French rugby union players
Living people
French sportspeople of Senegalese descent
Racing 92 players
Rugby union wings
France international rugby union players